John Charles Vivian (June 30, 1887 – February 10, 1964) was an American attorney, journalist, and Republican politician who served as the 30th governor of the state of Colorado from 1943 to 1947. He was the first lieutenant governor of Colorado to be elected governor.

John Charles Vivian was born in Golden, Colorado, on June 30, 1887.  The Vivian family was very prominent in Republican politics, of Cornish origin.  Vivian received a Bachelor of Arts degree from the University of Colorado in 1909 and a Bachelor of Laws degree from the University of Denver School of Law in 1913.  Vivian married Maude Charlotte Kleyn, a professor from the University of Michigan School of Music.  Vivian served in the United States Marines during World War I and became the Jefferson County Attorney in 1922.

John Vivian was elected Lieutenant Governor of Colorado in 1938.  In 1942, Republican Party officials decided to nominate Vivian for governor instead of incumbent Colorado Governor Ralph Lawrence Carr, who had angered many with his opposition to the internment of Japanese-American citizens.  Vivian was elected governor in 1942 and was reelected in 1944.  Governor Vivian was a staunch fiscal conservative in both public policy and his personal life.  He was labeled "our spend nothing governor" by both opponents and supporters.

Vivian died in Golden, Colorado, on February 10, 1964, at the age of seventy-six.

See also
History of Colorado
Law and government of Colorado
List of governors of Colorado
State of Colorado

References

Further reading

Colorado Legislative Council. Presidents and Speakers of the Colorado General Assembly: A Biographical Portrait From 1876. Denver: Eastwood Printing Co., 1980.
The Denver Post, February 14, 1943.
The Denver Post, May 8, 1945, page 2.
The Denver Post, September 20, 1945, page 7.
The Denver Post, January 27, 1947, page 4.
The Denver Post, August 7, 1947, page 17.
The Denver Times, June 14, 1908.
Empire Magazine, September 22, 1963, page 23.
Las Animas - Bent County Democrat, January 15, 1943.
Rocky Mountain News, October 16, 1942.
Rocky Mountain News, January 13, 1943.
Rocky Mountain News, November 6, 1943.
Rocky Mountain News, June 30, 1945, page 30.
Rocky Mountain News, July 10, 1946.
Rocky Mountain News, April 18, 1948, page 29.

External links
The Governors of Colorado
The Governor John Charles Vivian Collection at the Colorado State Archives

1887 births
1964 deaths
United States Marine Corps personnel of World War I
American people of Cornish descent
Republican Party governors of Colorado
Lieutenant Governors of Colorado
People from Golden, Colorado
20th-century American politicians